The Teenagers Featuring Frankie Lymon is the only album by The Teenagers Featuring Frankie Lymon and was released in 1956.

The album featured five singles with all singles charting on at least one chart and one single's B-side, "Who Can Explain?", also charting.

Track listing
All songs credited to Morris Levy except where noted.1
 "Why Do Fools Fall in Love" (Frankie Lymon/Levy) – 2:32
 "Please Be Mine" (Lymon/Levy) – 2:29
 "Who Can Explain" (Abner Silver/Roy Alfred) – 0:42
 "Share" (Vic Abrams/Jimmy Merchant) – 2:41
 "Love Is a Clown" (George Goldner) – 0:45
 "I Promise to Remember" (Jimmy Castor/Jimmy Smith) – 2:53
 "I Want You to Be My Girl" – 0:44
 "I'm Not a Know It All" (Buddy Kaye/Fred Spellman) – 3:33
 "Baby, Baby" (Milton Subotsky) – 2:27
 "The ABC's of Love" – 3:05
 "Am I Fooling Myself Again" – 3:00
 "I'm Not a Juvenile Delinquent" – 5:32

Note
 1Songwriters listed above are as they are listed on the album.  Songs credited to Levy have been disputed.

Personnel
Frankie Lymon – lead vocals
Joe Negroni – baritone vocals
Sherman Garnes – bass vocals
Herman Santiago – first tenor vocals 
Jimmy Merchant – second tenor vocals

Charts
Singles

References

1956 debut albums